Georges Hubatz (15 April 1912 – 20 October 1993) was a French racing cyclist. He rode in the 1935 Tour de France.

References

1912 births
1993 deaths
French male cyclists